Wat Photharam is an ancient temple in Ban Dong Bang, Dong Bang Sub-district, Na Dun District, Maha Sarakham Province, Isan region (northeastern) of Thailand.

The temple dating back to the King Nangklao (Rama III)'s reign, more than 200 years ago. It is situated in an old town zone called Ban Dong Bang. Previously, it was called "Wat Pho Thong" (วัดโพธิ์ทอง) and renamed to "Wat Photharam" as today in 1942 by the fourth abbot, Phra Kru Chan Di.

The most interesting thing and make this temple known were Hup Taem (ฮูปแต้ม) and Sim (สิม). Sim (main hall in Isan dialect) of the temple features the story of Sinxay, an epic poem of both Laos and Isan people. It was drawn with a process called Hup Taem (mural painting in Isan dialect).

Typically, according to all the ancient temples in the Isan, mural paintings, Buddha images, pulpits, and stucco designs of the temples in the Isan in the past are exquisite with the unique Isan art style. This began with the Lan Xang art then Isan art by Chinese and Annamese artisans and has continued to the near present, which is a period that the temples in the Isan were generally determined to be built like those in Bangkok.

Until today, the patterns of newly constructed temples have changed a lot, and the particular art of each temple has been transferred that has given an unusual perpetual feeling.

Wat Photharam is one example that clearly demonstrates this type of indigenous art alongside nearby temple Wat Pa Lelai.

The temple is registered as an ancient monument by the Fine Arts Department.

References

External links

Tourist attractions in Maha Sarakham province
19th-century Buddhist temples
Buddhist temples in Maha Sarakham Province